The 2020 Styrian motorcycle Grand Prix (officially known as the BMW M Grand Prix of Styria) was a Grand Prix motorcycle racing race held at the Red Bull Ring in Spielberg on 23 August 2020. It was the sixth round of the 2020 Grand Prix motorcycle racing season and the fifth round of the 2020 MotoGP World Championship. It was the first running of the Styrian motorcycle Grand Prix, and was held exactly one week after the 2020 Austrian Grand Prix on the same track, due to the rescheduling of the season because of the COVID-19 pandemic. The race was also the 900th premier class race.

In a dramatic race, Miguel Oliveira of Red Bull KTM Tech 3 won from Jack Miller (Pramac Racing) and Pol Espargaro (Red Bull KTM Factory Racing) at the final corner, on the final lap to win his and his team's first MotoGP race. Oliveira is also the first Portuguese rider to win a Grand Prix race in the premier class. Oliveira's victory meant that ending the winning streaks for Ducati on Red Bull Ring - which is Ducati has won there 5 times.

For the first time since the 2016 Dutch TT, all classes were won by a first time winner in that class.

Background

Impact of the COVID-19 pandemic 
 The opening rounds of the 2020 championship were heavily affected by the COVID-19 pandemic. Several Grands Prix were cancelled or postponed after the aborted opening round in Qatar, prompting the Fédération Internationale de Motocyclisme to draft a new calendar. However, the Austrian Grand Prix was not impacted by this change and kept its original date.

Organisers of the race signed a contract with Dorna Sports, the sport's commercial rights holder, to host a second round at the circuit on 23 August (a week after the first race) to be known as the "Styrian Grand Prix". The race was named for Styria, the state of Austria that the Red Bull Ring is located in. The race was also the second time in the sport's history that the same venue and circuit layout hosted back-to-back World Championship races.

MotoGP Championship standings before the race 
After the fourth round at the 2020 Austrian Grand Prix, Fabio Quartararo on 67 points, leads the championship by 11 points over Andrea Dovizioso with Maverick Viñales a further 19 points behind.

In Teams' Championship, Petronas Yamaha SRT with 98 points, lead the championship from Monster Energy Yamaha, who have 86. Ducati Team sit 10 points behind the factory Yamaha in third, and are 16 points ahead of fourth-placed  KTM Factory Racing, who have 42 points, while Team Suzuki Ecstar sit 5th on 50 points.

MotoGP Entrants 

 Stefan Bradl replaced Marc Márquez from the Czech Republic round onwards while he recovered from injuries sustained in his opening round crash.
 Ducati test rider Michele Pirro replaced Francesco Bagnaia in Austria while he recovered from injuries sustained in a crash during practice at the Czech round.

Free practice 
The first practice session ended with Jack Miller fastest for Pramac Racing ahead of Ducati's Andrea Dovizioso and Tech 3's Miguel Oliveira. The second practice session ended with Pol Espargaró fastest, followed by Nakagami and Joan Mir.

Combined Free Practice 1-2-3 
The top ten drivers (written in bold) qualified in Q2.

Free Practice 4 
The first three positions of the session were as follows.

Qualifying

MotoGP 

Notes
  – Johann Zarco  received a pit lane start penalty for his involvement in an accident with Franco Morbidelli in the Austrian motorcycle Grand Prix.

Warm Up

MotoGP 
The first three positions of the session are as follows.

Race

Race Report (MotoGP)

Initial Race 
The race was run in dry conditions despite the clouds looming. On the opening lap, Joan Mir  got a fantastic launch from P3 to the lead the race from polesitter Pol Espargaro, with Miller also getting a great start from fourth on the grid. The Australian got past Espargaro by going up the inside at Turn 2. After running wide and gaining an advantage at Turn 1 on the opening lap Mir was forced to drop a position, thus Miller inherited the race lead. Championship leader Fabio Quartararo made a poor start, and dropped to P14 after running wide at Turn 1. Andrea Dovizioso made a solid start and was up to sixth on Lap 2. Takaaki Nakagami got past Pol Espargaro and the top three slowly pulling clear of the chasing pack.

Lap 5 saw Mir lead the race with Miller and Nakagami half a second clear of Pol Espargaro and Alex Rins and that gap kept climbing as the race went ahead. On Lap 8 the leading trio were 1.4 clear, with the Yamahas dropping down the field. With 14 laps to go, Viñales slowed down and held his hand up to suggest something was wrong with his YZR-M1. Viñales continued but the Spaniard jumped off his Yamaha at Turn 1 in what looked like a brake failure. His machine smashed into the air-fence at Turn 1 and going up in flames. Viñales was able to walk away and brought the red flags out as the race came to a halt, with a 12-laps to go.

Restart 
The race began for a second time and Mir lead from pole, with Miller falling down from third. Pol Espargaro powered away from the line well but ran slightly wide into Turn 1, allowing Miller to regain position into Turn 2. Miller was leading Mir fought back on the exit but the Ducati rider held the inside line for Turn 6, with Nakagami dropping to seventh. With eight laps to go, Pol Espargaro set the fastest lap of the race. The KTM rider then made his move on Mir at Turn 3. Pol then attempted a pass up into Turn 1 but was wide, allowing Miller to  pass and Oliveira and Mir to close in. Mir was then wide at Turn 4, allowing Dovizioso to grab fourth as Miller and Oliveira . The top five were close, however Mir and Dovizioso were about to drop off the pace slightly with Doviziosio running wide again at Turn 9.

Heading onto the last lap, this was between two KTMs and a Ducati. Pol led onto the last lap and got a good run out of the first corner but braked too much defensively. This compromised his exit and Miller  made the move stick into the downhill right-hander. Miller held firm through the left-handers but Pol got the run up the hill and swerved to the inside and got underneath Miller. Miller braked late and dived underneath Pol. The duo went wide though and Oliveira, on his normal line, Oliveira got past Miller and Pol to seal a historic victory. Miller held onto second to pick up his second podium of the season, with Pol claiming P3.

Classification

MotoGP
The race, scheduled to be run for 28 laps, was red-flagged after 16 full laps due to an accident involving Maverick Viñales. The race was later restarted over 12 laps with the starting grid determined by the classification of the first part.

Moto2

 Sam Lowes was black flagged for riding in an irresponsible manner, after causing a collision with Jorge Navarro and Somkiat Chantra.

Moto3

Championship standings after the race
Below are the standings for the top five riders, constructors, and teams after the round.

MotoGP

Riders' Championship standings

Constructors' Championship standings

Teams' Championship standings

Moto2

Riders' Championship standings

Constructors' Championship standings

Teams' Championship standings

Moto3

Riders' Championship standings

Constructors' Championship standings

Teams' Championship standings

Notes

References

External links

Styrian
Styrian motorcycle Grand Prix
Styrian motorcycle Grand Prix
Styrian motorcycle Grand Prix